Kujala is a Finnish surname. Notable people with the surname include:

 Toivo Kujala (1894–1959), Finnish electrician and politician
 Urho Kujala (born 1957), Finnish orienteering competitor
 Jussi Kujala (born 1983), Finnish football player
 Patrick Kujala (born 1996), Spanish-born professional racing driver

Finnish-language surnames